Belus or Belos in classical Greek or classical Latin texts (and later material based on them) in an Assyrian context refers to one or another purportedly ancient and historically mythical Assyrian king, such king in part at least a euhemerization of the Babylonian god Bel Marduk.

Belus most commonly appears as the father of Ninus, who otherwise mostly appears as the first known Assyrian king. Ctesias provides no information about Ninus' parentage. But already in Herodotus there is a Ninus son of Belus among the ancestors of the Heraclid dynasty of Lydia, though here Belus is strangely and uniquely made a grandson of Heracles. See Omphale for discussion.

A fragment by Castor of Rhodes, preserved only in the Armenian translation of Eusebius of Caesarea, makes Belus king of Assyria at the time when Zeus and the other gods fought first the Titans and then the  Giants. Castor says Belus was considered a god after his death, but that he does not know how many years Belus reigned.

Belus elsewhere is a vague, ancestral figure. It was suggested in The Two Babylons by Alexander Hislop that he was originally a conqueror who fathered king Ninus the first, and that after Ninus' death his wife Semiramis began to claim Ninus as a Sun god, Cush (Belus) as the Lord God, herself as the mother goddess and her son Tammuz as the god of love, in an effort to control her subjects better after the death of her husband, and to allow her to rule as her newborn son's regent.

Some versions of the tale of Adonis make Adonis the son of Theias or Thias the King of Assyria, who is the son of Belus.

Ovid's Metamorphoses (4.212f) speaks of King Orchamus who ruled the Achaemenid cities of Persia as the 7th in line from ancient Belus the founder. But no other extant sources mention either Orchamus or his daughters Leucothoe and Clytie.

Nonnus in his Dionysiaca (18.5f) brings in King Staphylus of Assyria and his son Botrys who entertain Dionysus, characters unknown elsewhere. Staphylus claims to be grandson of Belus.

Diodorus Siculus (6.5.1) introduces the Roman god Picus (normally son of Saturn) as a king of Italy and calls him brother of Ninus (and therefore perhaps son of Belus).

The odd connection between Picus and Ninus reappears in John of Nikiû's Chronicle (6.2f) which relates that Cronus was the first king of Assyria and Persia, that he married an Assyrian woman named Rhea and that she bore him Picus (who was also called Zeus) and Ninus who founded the city of Ninus (Nineveh). Cronus removed to Italy but was then slain by his son Zeus Picus because he devoured his children. Then Zeus became the father of Belus by his own sister. After the disappearance of Zeus Picus (who apparently reigned over both Italy and Assyria), Belus son of Zeus Picus succeeded to the throne in Assyria (later Faunus who is elsewhere always the son of Picus reigns in Italy before moving to Egypt and turning into Hermes Trismegistus father of Hephaestus). Upon the death of Belus, his uncle Ninus became king and then married his own mother who was previously called Rhea but is now reintroduced under the name of Semiramis. It is explained that from that time on this custom was maintained so that Persians allegedly thought nothing of taking a mother or sister or daughter as a wife.

Later historians and chronographers make no mention of such stories. They either do not mention Belus at all or accept him as father of Ninus. They also dispute as to whether the Biblical Nimrod was the same as Belus, the father of Belus or a more distant ancestor of Belus.

It is likely that this Assyrian Belus should mostly not be distinguished from the euhemerized Babylonian Belus. But some chronographers make a distinction between them.

See also
Bel (mythology)
Ba`al
Belu (Assyrian king)

Sources

 

Mythological kings
Hellenistic historiography
Baal